Puthisen Neang Kangrey (lit. "Puthisen and Lady Kangrey", also called "Twelve Sisters") is a 1968 Cambodian film based on a Cambodian myth of the Twelve Sisters whose hero is Lady Kangrey, after whom a mountain range in Kampong Chhnang was named. The film has been re-released twice, in 2000 and 2002, and aired on the Cambodian channel Royal Cambodian Armed Forces Television.

Soundtrack

Cast
Kong Som Eun
Virak Dara
Nop Nem
Kim Nova
Saki Sbong
Ly Ratanak

1972 films
Cambodian drama films
Khmer-language films
1972 drama films